Bindi Rahman, popularly known as Baby Bindi, is a Bangladeshi film actress. She won the Bangladesh National Film Award for Best Child Artist for the 1982 film Lal Kajol. 
Personal life:
 Father:Azizur Rahman

Filmography
 Lal Kajol'' (1982)

Awards and nominations
National Film Awards

References

External links

 Bangladeshi film actresses
 Best Child Artist National Film Award (Bangladesh) winners
 Living people
 Year of birth missing (living people)